Nationality words link to articles with information on the nation's poetry or literature (for instance, Irish or France).

Events
 May – First publication of one of 16-year-old English poet Thomas Chatterton's poems attributed to the imaginary medieval monk "Thomas Rowley", "Elinoure and Juga", in Alexander Hamilton's Town and Country Magazine. This year also Chatterton sends specimens of "Rowley"’s poetry and history The Ryse of Peyncteynge yn Englade to Horace Walpole who at first offers to print them but, discovering Chatterton's age and rightly considering the pieces might be forgeries, later scornfully dismisses him.

Works published

United Kingdom
 Mary Bowes, Countess of Strathmore and Kinghorne, The Siege of Jerusalem, drama
 Thomas Chatterton, "Elinoure and Juga"
 Thomas Gray, Ode Performed in the Senate-House at Cambridge, July 1, 1769
 Richard Hurd, Ancient and Modern Scots Songs
 John Ogilvie, Paradise, published anonymously
 Clara Reeve, Original Poems on several Occasions
 Tobias Smollett, The History and Adventures of an Atom, published anonymously

Other
 Jacques Delille, verse translation of Virgil's Georgics from the original Latin into French; the translation led to the author's award of the chair of Latin poetry at the Collège de France and membership in the Académie Française in 1774
 Basílio da Gama, O Uraguai, an epic Brazilian poem
 Jean-François, marquis de Saint-Lambert, Saisons, modeled on Thomson's Seasons
 Martin Wieland, Musarion, Germany

Births
Death years link to the corresponding "[year] in poetry" article:
 May 21 – John Hookham Frere (died 1846), English diplomat, poet and author
 November 12 – Amelia Opie (died 1853), English novelist and poet
 December 7 (bapt.) – Ann Batten Cristall (died 1848), English poet
 December 26 – Ernst Moritz Arndt (died 1860), German patriotic author and poet
 Also:
 Robert Hetrick (died 1849), Scottish poet and blacksmith
 George Howe (died 1821), Saint Christopher Island-born Australian printer and poet

Deaths
Birth years link to the corresponding "[year] in poetry" article:
 January 5 – James Merrick (born 1720), English poet and scholar
 January 20 – Sneyd Davies (born 1709), English poet and churchman
 November 27 – Kamo no Mabuchi 賀茂真淵 (born 1697), Japanese Edo period poet and philologist
 December 13 – Christian Fürchtegott Gellert (born 1715), German poet

See also

 List of years in poetry
 List of years in literature
 18th century in poetry
 18th century in literature
 French literature of the 18th century
 Sturm und Drang (the conventional translation is "Storm and Stress"; a more literal translation, however, might be "storm and urge", "storm and longing", "storm and drive" or "storm and impulse"), a movement in German literature (including poetry) and music from the late 1760s through the early 1780s
 List of years in poetry
 Poetry

Notes

18th-century poetry
Poetry